The Osprey HSY-56A-class gunboat (also known as Machitis-class gunboat) is a class of naval vessel currently in service in the Hellenic Navy. They are the most modern patrol vessels of Hellenic Navy. The first ship of the class named Machitis (pronounced "Makhitis") was commissioned on 29 October 2003. In 2018 all of the four ships of the class are in active service.

Incidents at sea
On 17 January 2018 the second ship of the class Nikiforos was bumped by a Turkish Coast Guard patrol boat while patrolling in the Aegean Sea close to the Imia islets. The Turkish patrol boat was conducting dangerous manoeuvres having as a result a slight collision of the two vessels. Turkish media reported the incident too but without highlighting the bumping of the Greek ship.

Ships

Gallery

References

Gunboat classes
Patrol vessels of the Hellenic Navy
Patrol vessels